Henry Robert Bastow (1839 – 30 September 1920) was an Australian architect, known for overseeing the design and construction of over 600 schools for the new Victorian Department of Education in the 1870s and 1880s. He was also a leading member of the Plymouth Brethren in Melbourne, Victoria.

Background and career 
Born in Bridport, England, Bastow studied architecture in nearby Dorchester, at the same time as Thomas Hardy, later a noted author, was apprenticed to local architect John Hicks.

In about 1860, he emigrated to Tasmania, where he won a competition for a new Hobart Town Hall in 1861 (not built). In 1866 he moved north to Melbourne, Victoria and became a draughtsman with the Victorian Water Supply Department, and later, architect and civil engineer with the Railways Department.

He returned to Tasmania in 1867 to marry Eliza Litchfield, daughter of a previous Hobart mayor.

Following the passing of the Education Act in 1872, which provided for free, compulsory and secular primary school education in Victoria, hundreds of schools were required. Bastow was appointed Architect and Surveyor of the newly formed Education Department, responsible for their design and construction.

In 1873, a competition was held for designs for schools of different sizes, from which a number were awarded prizes. Few of these designs were built exactly as submitted, instead Bastow adapted them to differing sizes and sites, adding details, and designed many more himself.

Nearly all the early schools were in a similar Victorian Gothic Revival style, usually picturesque, but some symmetrical, with walls of face brick, usually brown, a few in bluestone, with highlights in contrasting brickwork, pointed arch windows, steep slate roofs, prominent gables, some with jerkinhead roofs, and a small bell tower, usually over the entrance. A range of much smaller, simpler rural schools, sometimes on timber, were also designed, also in this Gothic idiom. Schools of the later 1870s and the 1880s were more elaborate, with polychrome brickwork, Gothic traceried windows and prominent towers, some with a more Queen Anne or Tudor character. By the early 1880s, the department had built over 600 schools across Victoria, and a large majority are still functioning as schools. At least 25 of the schools designed by Bastow are listed on the Victorian Heritage Register.

In 1883, the architecture branch of the Education Department became part of the Public Works Department, and Bastow became a senior architect within the department, working on a wider variety of public buildings, as well as schools. In 1886 Bastow became the chief Government Architect of the Public Works Department in Victoria, a position he held until 1890. In the later years of his tenure, the architects of the Public Works Department produced designs in a wider range of styles than earlier decades, which were marked by simplicity and restraint.

Latter years 
Following his departure from that position, he retired from public life to central Victoria, built a simple home equipped with a meeting room for his Brethren fellows, and became an apple orchardist.

He continued a correspondence with Thomas Hardy on personal and religious matters.

Gallery

References

Further reading

 Martin, Ray. Thomas Hardy Remembered
 Private Archive of Edwin Cross, London SE18
 Bastow Legacy (blog), Bastow Institute, Melbourne, c2015, first page here.

Victorian (Australia) architects
Australian Plymouth Brethren
1839 births
1920 deaths